Illinois Route 134 (IL 134) is a  east–west state route in northeastern Illinois. It runs from U.S. Route 12 (US 12) and IL 59 in Fox Lake to IL 120 (Belvidere Road) in Hainesville.

Route description 
Illinois 134 is called Big Hollow Road in Fox Lake. In Round Lake Beach it is called Round Lake Road west of downtown, and Main Street east of downtown. After its terminus, Big Hollow Road continues further west for an additional 5.8 miles under county control first as Lake County Highway A26. It then crosses the county line and becomes McHenry County Highway A26 and continues until Illinois Route 31.

History 
SBI Route 134 originally ran from Paris to the Indiana state line on what is now U.S. Route 150. In 1950, it was placed on the current route, and has not been changed since.

Major Intersections

References 

134
U.S. Route 150
Transportation in Lake County, Illinois